Octotoma is a genus of tortoise beetles and hispines in the family Chrysomelidae. There are about 12 described species in Octotoma.

Species
These 12 species belong to the genus Octotoma:

 Octotoma brasiliensis Weise, 1921
 Octotoma championi Baly, 1886 (lantana leafminer)
 Octotoma crassicornis Weise, 1910
 Octotoma germari Hagenbach
 Octotoma gundlachii Suffrian, 1868
 Octotoma intermedia Staines, 1989
 Octotoma marginicollis Horn, 1883
 Octotoma nigra Uhmann, 1940
 Octotoma plicatula (Fabricius, 1801) (trumpet creeper leaf miner)
 Octotoma puncticollis Staines, 1994
 Octotoma scabripennis Guérin-Méneville, 1844
 Octotoma variegata Uhmann, 1954

References

Further reading

 
 
 
 
 

Cassidinae
Articles created by Qbugbot